Dorstenia ramosa is a species of herb in the plant family Moraceae which is native to eastern Brazil.

References

ramosa
Endemic flora of Brazil
Flora of the Atlantic Forest
Flora of Rio de Janeiro (state)
Plants described in 1973
Vulnerable flora of South America